Saphenista ochraurea is a species of moth of the family Tortricidae. It is found in Carchi Province, Ecuador.

The wingspan is about 13 mm. The ground colour of the forewings is creamy ochreous, mixed ochreous brownish in the dorsal area with glossy creamy along the edges of the markings. The hindwings are brownish, but paler at the base.

References

Moths described in 2002
Saphenista